Robert Guillin (14 February 1926 – 25 November 2013) was a French basketball player. He competed in the men's tournament at the 1952 Summer Olympics.

References

1926 births
2013 deaths
French men's basketball players
Olympic basketball players of France
Basketball players at the 1952 Summer Olympics
Place of birth missing